21stAnnie Awards
November 5, 1993

Best Feature Film: 
Aladdin

Best Television Program: 
The Simpsons

The 21st Annie Awards were given by the International Animated Film Association to honor outstanding achievements in the animation field in 1992.

Production categories 
Winners are listed first, highlighted in boldface, and indicated with a double dagger.

Juried Awards 

Winsor McCay Award Recognition for career contributions to the art of animation
 Roy E. Disney
 Jack Zander
 George Dunning

Outstanding Individual Achievement in the Field of Animation
 Ed Gombert
 Ron Clements
 Dan Castellaneta
 Eric Goldberg

Certificate of Merit Recognition for service to the art, craft and industry of animation
 Judi Cassell
 Dave Master

References 

1993
1993 film awards
Annie
Annie